Michael John "Mick" Bennett (born 8 June 1949, Birmingham) is a British former cyclist and cycle race promoter.

Cycling career
He won the bronze medal in Team Pursuit in the 1972 Munich and  1976 Montreal Games.

He represented England in the 1 km time trial, at the 1970 British Commonwealth Games in Edinburgh, Scotland. Four years later he competed in the scratch and pursuit disciplines and won a gold medal in the 4,000 metres team pursuit at the 1974 British Commonwealth Games in Christchurch, New Zealand.

He was five times a British champion winning the British National Sprint in 1977,  two British National Madison Championships (1973 & 1975) and two British National Individual Time Trial Championships (1971 & 1972).

Bennett originally took up cycling as part of a programme of rehabilitation after developing Osgood–Schlatter disease. In 2004, Bennett formed Sweetspot Management, which organises the Tour of Britain, the Tour Series, The Women's Tour and (in collaboration with the London Marathon) RideLondon.

References

1949 births
Living people
English male cyclists
Cyclists at the 1972 Summer Olympics
Cyclists at the 1976 Summer Olympics
Olympic cyclists of Great Britain
Olympic bronze medallists for Great Britain
Olympic medalists in cycling
Sportspeople from Birmingham, West Midlands
Medalists at the 1972 Summer Olympics
Medalists at the 1976 Summer Olympics
Commonwealth Games medallists in cycling
Commonwealth Games gold medallists for England
Cyclists at the 1970 British Commonwealth Games
Cyclists at the 1974 British Commonwealth Games
Medallists at the 1974 British Commonwealth Games